Anatol Chiriac is a Moldovan composer.

Biography 

Born in 1953. In 1979 he completed Stefan Neaga music college in Chişinău.
In 1983 he recorded his first instrumental works LP, which has strong influence of James Last (e. g. use of panflute and others). His next LP, issued in 1984, represented songs to verses by Grigore Vieru. The song "Romantică" (Романтикэ), performed by Sofia Rotaru, quickly became a hit in the entire Soviet Union. During few years his composition "Mihaela"  (Михаэла) accomplished weather forecasts in the Soviet TV news program "Vremya" (Время).
Near 1985 Chiriac formed his own instrumental ensemble, recorded with it new LP and had tours to Japan and Mocambique.
In 1990-1994 Chiriac was elected to the Parliament of Moldova.

External links 
 Cine au fost şi ce fac deputaţii primului Parlament din R. Moldova (1990-1994)?
 Declaraţia deputaţilor din primul Parlament
 Site-ul Parlamentului Republicii Moldova

References

Living people
Soviet composers
Soviet male composers
Moldovan composers
Male composers
Moldovan MPs 1990–1994
Popular Front of Moldova MPs
1947 births
20th-century male musicians
21st-century male musicians